is a former Japanese professional baseball player.

External links

1975 births
Living people
Baseball people from Hyōgo Prefecture
Ritsumeikan University alumni
Japanese baseball players
Nippon Professional Baseball outfielders
Osaka Kintetsu Buffaloes players
Orix Buffaloes players
Japanese baseball coaches
Nippon Professional Baseball coaches